Independent Olympic Athletes is the team of Indian athletes who are competing at the 2013 Asian Youth Games in Nanjing, China, from 16 to 24 August 2013.

Background
Indian athletes participated in the Games under the Olympic flag due to the suspension of the country's National Olympic Committee (NOC). Indian Olympic Association was suspended by the International Olympic Committee due to government interference in the autonomy of the country’s NOC.

Over-aged athletes
The organising committee of the Games, Nanjing Asian Youth Games Organising Committee, barred participation of some Indian athletes who were supposed to compete in the athletics and weightlifting events "because they were above the stipulated age of 17". The incident attracted widespread media coverage and prompted government action. The Ministry of Youth Affairs and Sports "ordered an inquiry to fix responsibility on the officials for the fiasco which had brought embarrassment to the country".

Athletics

Boys'
Track events

Girls'
Track events

Field

Judo

Boys'

Girls'

Golf

Shooting
Men

Women

Swimming

Boys'

Girls'

Squash
Individual

Team

Table tennis

Tennis

Weightlifting

Men's

Women's

References

External links
 Official website of the Games

Nations at the 2013 Asian Youth Games
2013 in Indian sport
Independent athletes